Route 310 is a  east–west secondary highway in the northeast Canadian province of New Brunswick. 

The route's eastern terminus is near the centre of Lameque Island. The route (named Rue des Cedres) travels east to the town of Coteau Road. From here, the highway takes a sharp turn north towards Grand Etang and it ends at Route 305

See also
List of New Brunswick provincial highways

References

310
310